The 2006–07 LEN Euroleague was the 44th edition of LEN's premier competition for men's water polo clubs. It ran from 5 October 2006 to 23 June 2007, and it is contested by 40 teams. The Final Four (semifinals, final, and third place game) took place on June 22 and June 23 in Milan.

Preliminary round

Group A

Group B

Group C

Group D

Knockout stage

Quarter-finals
The first legs were played on 5 May, and the second legs were played on 23 May 2007.

|}

Final Four
Piscina Scarioni, Milan, Italy.

Final standings

See also 
 2006–07 LEN Cup

External links 

LEN Champions League seasons
Champions League
2006 in water polo
2007 in water polo